The Jammu and Kashmir Instrument of Accession is a legal document executed by Maharaja Hari Singh, ruler of the princely state of Jammu and Kashmir, on 26 October 1947.

Parties
By executing an Instrument of Accession under the provisions of the Indian Independence Act 1947, Maharaja Hari Singh agreed to accede his state to the Dominion of India.

On 27 October 1947, the then Governor-General of India, Lord Mountbatten accepted the accession. In a letter sent to Maharaja Hari Singh on the same day, he said, "it is my Government's wish that as soon as law and order have been restored in Jammu and Kashmir and her soil cleared of the invader the question of the State's accession should be settled by a reference to the people."

Pakistan claimed that the accession was "fraudulent", that the Maharaja acted under "duress", and that he had no right to accede to India at a time when a standstill agreement with Pakistan was still in force.

The accession to India is celebrated on Accession Day, which is held annually on 26 October.

Text

The text of the Instrument of Accession, excluding the schedule mentioned in its third point, is as follows:

Schedule
The Schedule referred to in paragraph 3 of the Instrument of Accession reads as follows:

Date
While the Instrument of Accession carries the date of 26 October, some scholars believe that it was actually signed on 27 October. However, the fact that the Governor General accepted the accession on 27 October, the day the Indian troops were airlifted into Kashmir, is generally accepted.

An Indian commentator, Prem Shankar Jha, has argued that the accession was actually signed by Hari Singh on 25 October 1947, just before he left Srinagar for Jammu.

Before taking any action on the Maharaja's request for help, the Government of India decided to send V. P. Menon, representing  it, who flew to Srinagar on 25 October. On realizing the state of emergency, Menon advised the Maharaja to leave immediately for Jammu, for his own safety. He followed this advice and left Srinagar for Jammu that night, while Menon and Prime Minister Mahajan flew to Delhi early the next morning, 26 October. When they reached there, the Indian Government promised Menon and Mahajan military assistance for Jammu and Kashmir, but only after the Instrument of Accession had been signed. Hence, Menon immediately flew back to Jammu with the Instrument. The official version of events is that on his arrival, he contacted the Maharaja, who was asleep after a long journey, but who at once signed the Instrument. Menon then flew back immediately to Delhi with the legal documents on 26 October.

Commentary 
In 1950, a United States Department of State memorandum prepared by American diplomats George C. McGhee and John D. Hickerson, approved by Secretary of State Dean Acheson, stated on the basis of an Office of Legal Counsel opinion that the Instrument of Accession could not finalize the accession to either dominion. According to this memorandum, the Attorney General for England and Wales and Foreign Office legal advisors felt that the accession was inconsistent with Kashmir’s obligations to Pakistan, and for that reason it was "perhaps invalid".

See also
 Instrument of Accession
 Instrument of Accession of Junagadh
 History of Kashmir
 Jammu and Kashmir Constitution Act 1939

References and notes
Notes

Citations

Bibliography

Further reading

External links
 Venkatesh Nayak, Exclusive: For the First Time, a True Copy of Jammu & Kashmir’s Instrument of Accession, The Wire, 26 October 2016.
 Proclamation of 1 May 1951 on Jammu & Kashmir Constituent Assembly by Yuvraj (Crown Prince) Karan Singh from the Official website of Government of Jammu and Kashmir, India
 Conflict in Kashmir: Selected Internet Resources by the Library, University of California, Berkeley, USA; University of California, Berkeley Library Bibliographies and Web-Bibliographies list

Legal documents
History of the Republic of India
Indian documents
Kashmir conflict
1947 in India
Treaties concluded in 1947
Treaties entered into force in 1947
1947 documents
Jammu and Kashmir (princely state)